Marie Donigan (born June 17, 1954) is an American politician and architect who served as a member of the Michigan State House of Representatives for the 26th District from January 1, 2005 to January 1, 2011.

Early life and education

Donigan was born in Royal Oak, Michigan and attended Dondero High School. She earned a B.S. from Western Michigan University and a M.S. in Landscape Architecture from the University of Pennsylvania.

Career 
Donigan worked in private practice as a landscape architect for a number of years, before joining the Farmington Hills Department of Planning.

She was elected to the Royal Oak City Commission in 1997, and served until 2004, when she resigned in order to serve as State Representative.
She defeated Republican City Commissioner Carlo P. Ginotti.
She was re-elected in 2006, defeating Republican Kevin Konczal, and again reelected in 2008.

The chief focus of her legislative work in the Michigan House has been in the areas of education, health care, public transit and the economy. She was the author of a bill to build a Public Transportation system for the Metro Detroit Area along the Woodward Avenue Corridor.

After Donigan left office due to term limits, she began working as a non-profit executive.

Personal life 
She is married to Kevin McLogan, who was the a trustee of the Royal Oak School Board from 1997 to 2009.

Election results

|- style="background-color:#E9E9E9"
! align=left valign=top | 2004 Candidate
! align=right | Party
! align=right | Popular votes
! align=right | Vote percentage
|-
|align=left valign=top|Marie Donigan
|valign="top"|Democrat
|valign="top"|22,780
|valign="top"|52.08%
|-
|align=left valign=top|Carlo Ginotti
|valign="top"|Republican
|valign="top"|20,954
|valign="top"|47.91%
|- style="background-color:#E9E9E9"
! align=left valign=top | 2006 Candidate
! align=right | Party
! align=right | Popular votes
! align=right | Vote percentage
|-
|align=left valign=top|Marie Donigan
|valign="top"|Democrat
|valign="top"|22,077
|valign="top"|62%
|-
|align=left valign=top|Kevin Konczal
|valign="top"|Republican
|valign="top"|12,357
|valign="top"|35%
|-
|align=left valign=top|James Young
|valign="top"|Libertarian
|valign="top"|1,057
|valign="top"|3%
|-
|}

References

External links
 Marie Donigan's Michigan House Democrat Website
 Campaign Website

1954 births
Democratic Party members of the Michigan House of Representatives
Living people
People from Royal Oak, Michigan
Women state legislators in Michigan
Western Michigan University alumni
University of Pennsylvania School of Design alumni
21st-century American women